The West Midlands conurbation is the large conurbation that includes the cities of Birmingham and Wolverhampton and the towns of Sutton Coldfield, Dudley, Walsall, West Bromwich, Solihull, Stourbridge and Halesowen in the West Midlands, England. It is also referred to as the Birmingham urban area and is one of the most populated and densely populated built-up areas in the United Kingdom.

Not to be confused with the region or metropolitan county of the same name, the conurbation does not include parts of the metropolitan county such as Coventry, but does include parts of the surrounding counties of Staffordshire (e.g. Little Aston, Perton and Essington) and Worcestershire (such as Hagley and Hollywood).

According to the 2011 Census the area had a population of 2,440,986, making it the third most populated in the United Kingdom behind the Greater London and the Urban areas of Greater Manchester.  The conurbation sits within the UK's (and therefore England's) largest metropolitan area outside London (known as the Birmingham Metropolitan Area).

The conurbation also has several other unofficial names such as Greater Birmingham, the West Midlands Metro Area, the Birmingham conurbation, and the Birmingham-Wolverhampton conurbation.  However it is (Greater) Birmingham & The Black Country that has gained the widest traction as an alternative to the generally unpopular official name of the Conurbation.  An example of this is the tagline used by BBC Radio WM - “The sound of Birmingham & The Black Country”.

The conurbation is polycentric - Birmingham and Wolverhampton have separate Eurostat Larger Urban Zones, and there are separate Travel to Work areas defined for Birmingham, Wolverhampton, Dudley & Sandwell and Walsall & Cannock; whilst the extreme south-west corner of the conurbation at Hagley is within the Kidderminster Travel to Work Area, and the extreme south-east corner is within the Warwick & Stratford upon Avon TTWA.

Constituent parts

Although the exact boundaries of any conurbation are open to debate, dependent on what criteria are used to determine where an urban area ceases, the Office for National Statistics defines the West Midlands Built Up Area as including the urban areas of Birmingham, Wolverhampton, Solihull, West Bromwich, Dudley, and Walsall amongst others. These settlements are not coterminous with the Metropolitan Boroughs of the same name.

Coventry is separated from the West Midlands conurbation by the Meriden Gap, and other urban areas, such as Cannock and Codsall remain separate from the conurbation. Coventry is 19 miles east of Birmingham.

Administration
Occasionally the conurbation is seen as being coterminous with the West Midlands Metropolitan county; however, this includes Coventry, which is separate from the main urban area, and excludes the parts of the surrounding counties of Staffordshire, Warwickshire and Worcestershire that fall within the conurbation.

For administrative purposes, the vast majority of the conurbation falls within the six Metropolitan Boroughs of Birmingham, Dudley, Sandwell, Solihull, Walsall and Wolverhampton.

Two Local enterprise partnerships (LEPs) cover the majority of the conurbation area:  Black Country LEP comprises the local authorities of Dudley, Sandwell, Walsall and Wolverhampton while the Greater Birmingham & Solihull LEP includes those two authorities and a number of satellite boroughs, many remote from the conurbation and not traditionally associated with it (Bromsgrove, Cannock Chase, East Staffordshire, Lichfield, Redditch, Tamworth and Wyre Forest).

Settlements

2011 Census
The West Midlands Built Up Area consists of the below subdivisions.  Due to the change in methodology between the 2001 and 2011 Census, and the amount of change between 2011 Census and previous census data, it is impossible to compare the data directly between 2011 and earlier Censuses. 

In the 2011 Census, Coleshill and Water Orton are two separate built-up areas with populations of 6,341 and 3,444 respectively.  Prior to 2011, they were considered part of the West Midlands Urban Area.

Prior censuses 
Prior to the 2011 census, the conurbation was known by the ONS as the West Midlands Urban Area, which contained the following Urban Sub-Divisions:

Notes:

See also

 Constituent areas of Birmingham, England
 List of areas in Dudley
 List of areas in Sandwell
 List of areas in Walsall
 List of areas in Wolverhampton

References

External links

 

Urban areas of England
Geography of the West Midlands (county)
West Midlands (region)